The Cessna 177 Cardinal is a light single-engine, high-wing general aviation aircraft produced by Cessna. It was intended to replace the Cessna 172 Skyhawk. First announced in 1967, it was produced from 1968 to 1978.

Development
The Cessna 177 was designed in the mid-1960s when the engineers at Cessna were asked to create a "futuristic 1970s successor to the Cessna 172". The resulting aircraft featured newer technology such as a cantilever wing lacking the lift struts of previous models, and a new laminar flow airfoil.  The 177 is the only production high-wing single-engined Cessna since the Cessna 190 & 195 series to have both fixed landing gear and a cantilever wing without strut bracing.

In 1971, Cessna experimented with a "Quiet Cardinal" similar to the Beechcraft QU-22 Pave Eagle. A test model was flown with a Wankel engine with a large three bladed 100 inch diameter propeller with a belt driven gear reduction unit and a fuselage-length exhaust canted upward.

The 1968 model 177 was introduced in late 1967 with a 150 hp (112 kW) engine.  One of the design goals of this 172 replacement was to allow the pilot an unobstructed view when making a turn. In the 172 the pilot sits under the wing and when the wing is lowered to begin a turn that wing blocks the pilot's view of where the turn will lead to. The engineers resolved this problem by placing the pilot forward of the wing's leading edge, but that led to a too-far-forward center of gravity.

This problem was partially counteracted by the decision to use the significantly lighter Lycoming O-320 four-cylinder engine in place of the six-cylinder O-300 Continental used on the 172.  The forward CG situation still existed even with the lighter engine, so a stabilator was chosen, to provide sufficient elevator control authority at low airspeeds.

The 177 design was intended to be a replacement for the 172, which was to be discontinued after introduction of the new aircraft. The new design was originally to be called the 172J (to follow the 1968 model 172I). However, as the time came to make the transition, there was considerable resistance to the replacement of the 172 from the company's Marketing Division.  The 1969 172 jumped to the designator 172K—there is no 172J.

The 177 offers much better upward visibility than a 172 because of its steeply raked windshield and more aft-mounted wing. The absence of an obstructing wing support strut also makes the aircraft an excellent platform for aerial photography.

Performance and handling problems

Soon after delivery of the first Cardinals to customers there were reported incidents of pilot-induced oscillation (PIO) that alarmed Cessna enough that the factory initiated a priority program to eliminate the problem. Reviewer Joe Christy explains:

The solution, which was provided to all aircraft already delivered at no cost, was known as Operation "Cardinal Rule" and included a series of 23 inspection, installation, and modification instructions. This Service Letter, SE68-14, consisted of modifying the stabilator to install slots just behind the leading edge (to delay the onset of stabilator stall) and installing full counterbalance (11 pounds versus the original 7 pounds) on the stabilator to eliminate the PIO problem.

The 177, with its 150 hp (112 kW) powerplant, was considered "underpowered", even though it had more power than the 145 hp (108 kW) Cessna 172.

Cessna 177A
Recognizing that the aircraft was underpowered, Cessna introduced the 177A in 1969.  The revision featured a 180 hp (135 kW) four-cylinder Lycoming O-360, moving the design's price and role somewhere between that of the 172 and 182.  The additional power improved cruise speed by 11 knots (20 km/h).

Cessna 177B
1970 saw the introduction of the 177B, which had a new wing airfoil, a constant-speed propeller, and other minor improvements. When empty, the 177B weighed 145 lb (66 kg) more than the earlier 177, with its maximum takeoff weight increased from 2,350 lb (1,067 kg) to 2,500 lb (1,135 kg).

In 1978, Cessna built a deluxe version of the 177B, the Cardinal Classic, with leather upholstery, a table for the rear passengers, and a 28-Volt electrical system.

Cessna 177RG
The final aircraft in the 177 line was the retractable-gear 177RG Cardinal RG, which Cessna began producing in 1970. Both the nose-wheel and main wheels retract rearwards, with the nose-wheel enclosed by doors when retracted.

To offset the  increase in empty weight, much of which was from the electrically powered hydraulic gear mechanism, the 177RG had a  Lycoming IO-360 engine. This also allowed increase of the maximum weight by 300 lbs.

Those built in France by Reims were referred to as the Reims F177RG.

Notable accidents and incidents
On 23 October 1968, Alben Truitt, the grandson of former U.S. Vice President Alben Barkley, hijacked a Cessna 177 from Key West to Cuba. He returned via Canada in February 1969 and was sentenced to 20 years for aircraft piracy and 20 years for kidnapping (to run consecutively).
On 11 April 1996, a Cessna 177B carrying 7-year-old Jessica Dubroff, her certified flight instructor and her father, crashed after takeoff from Cheyenne Airport in Cheyenne, Wyoming, killing all on board. Dubroff was attempting to set a cross-country record for young pilots, although her instructor was thought to have been at the controls at the time of the accident. No defect in the aircraft itself was found. The accident resulted in general public concern and new Federal legislation banning record attempts by non-holders of private pilot or higher certificates.
On 30 July 1998, a Cessna 177RG Cardinal collided with Proteus Airlines Flight 706, a Beechcraft 1900D which deviated over Quiberon Bay from its planned approach to Lorient, France, to give its passengers and crew a better view of the ocean liner . Both aircraft crashed into the bay, killing all 14 people on board the Beechcraft and the sole occupant of the Cessna 177RG.
On 14 March 2003, a Cessna 177 Cardinal crashed into Old Fort Mountain near Old Fort, North Carolina, after taking off from Asheville Regional Airport in Asheville, North Carolina. The crash killed author Amanda Davis, who was on a book tour promoting her first novel Wonder When You'll Miss Me, and her parents.

Specifications (Cessna 177B)

See also

References

External links

177
High-wing aircraft
Single-engined tractor aircraft
1960s United States civil utility aircraft
Aircraft first flown in 1967